Pictou (Canadian Gaelic: Baile Phiogto) is a town in Pictou County, in the Canadian province of Nova Scotia. Located on the north shore of Pictou Harbour, the town is approximately 10 km (6 miles) north of the larger town of New Glasgow.

Once an active shipping port and the shire town of the county, today Pictou is primarily a local service centre for surrounding rural communities and the primary tourist destination in this region of Nova Scotia.

The name Pictou derives from the Mi'kmaq name , meaning "explosive place", a reference to the river of pitch that was found in the area, or perhaps from methane bubbling up from coal seams below the harbour.

History
Pictou Town had been the location of an annual Mi'kmaq summer coastal community prior to European settlement. Pictou was part of the Epekwitk aq Piktuk Mi'kmaq District, which included present-day Prince Edward Island and Pictou.

Pictou Town was a receiving point for many Scottish immigrants moving to a new home in northern Nova Scotia and Cape Breton Island following the Highland Clearances of the late 18th and early 19th centuries. The first wave of immigrants arrived on September 15, 1773, on the Hector. While there were a significant number of Scottish people settled in other parts of Nova Scotia at the time Pictou was settled, the town's tourism slogan is "The Birthplace of New Scotland", which is based on being the first primarily made up Scottish immigrants and the ship Hector being recognized as the first immigrant ship to sail directly from Scotland to what is now Canada. Pictou today contains many important examples of stone housing constructed by those early generations of Scottish immigrant, which have clear connections to architectural styles and design in Scotland itself.

When the Hector arrived, there were already a few families in Pictou that had arrived on the Betsy six years earlier. The town has an indirect connection to Scottish settlement in New Zealand; the Reverend Norman McLeod emigrated to Pictou from Scotland some years after the Hector but eventually re-settled with his parishioners at St. Ann's on Cape Breton Island. He later encouraged his parishioners to move to Waipu where there are still many descendants from Pictou and St. Ann's.

During the American Revolution, in November 1777 at Pictou, American privateers from Machias captured the ship Molly, under the command of Captain William Lowden.  Local resident Wellwood Waugh was implicated in the raid on Pictou and was forced to move to Tatamagouche, Nova Scotia. He became a prominent inhabitant and Waugh River is named after him.    

In 1812 Sir Hector Maclean (the 7th Baronet of Morvern and 23rd Chief of the Clan Maclean) emigrated to Pictou from Glensanda and Kingairloch in Scotland with almost the entire population of 500. Sir Hector is buried in the cemetery at Pictou.

During the latter part of the 19th century, Pictou's industrial sector gained strength. The Intercolonial Railway was built to the town on a spur from the Stellarton-Oxford Junction "Short Line". Shipbuilding increased through the 19th century, particularly with the increase in coal being shipped from Pictou Landing, Abercrombie and the East River of Pictou. A number of shipyards have been continuously established in the town since this period. A notable shipbuilding accomplishment was the speedy construction of 24 Park ship freighters by the newly created Pictou Shipyard in World War II. After the war the shipyard continued operation building many fishing trawlers and ferries. The port's cargo activity increased after the nearby Scott Maritimes pulp mill opened in Abercrombie in 1965. CN Rail abandoned its service to the town in the late 1980s but other transportation - including Highway 106 (the Trans-Canada Highway) - opened in the 1970s to provide alternatives.

Demographics 

Education
Pictou Academy is the town's high school and was founded in 1803 by Dr. Thomas McCulloch, who was travelling to his new clergy posting on Prince Edward Island. He was convinced to stay the winter and ended up remaining in Pictou for much longer. Disappointed by the lack of education among Pictonians, Dr. McCulloch decided to start a "college". There was considerable argument between Dr. Thomas McCulloch and Nova Scotia's provincial government for funding however it finally became a reality in 1816 when the Pictou Academy was incorporated. The province of Nova Scotia would not let it be named a "college," as such, but it was a school of higher education (senior matriculation) which was open to people of every race and denomination.

Between 1816 and the present, Pictou Academy has been in four separate buildings. The school was moved from its original building to a new site, while the second and third buildings both burned down. There were Academy graduates from every year since it was incorporated, excluding the years between several of its different buildings.

At the start of the school year of 2003–2004, all high schools in Pictou County were closed, and their students began to go to the two new "superschools", Northumberland Regional High School, and North Nova Education Centre, for their education. The only exception to this is Pictou Academy, which continues to operate.

The town operates a small library and C@P site.

Attractions
The primary tourist attraction in Pictou Town is the waterfront along Pictou Town Harbour. During the 1990s-2000s, industrial land on the Pictou Town waterfront was redeveloped with the centrepiece being construction of the replica tall ship Hector. Now completed, the ship is docked each summer at the Hector Heritage Quay, an interpretive centre that includes three floors of exhibits, as well as access to the floating replica. From 2020 to 2023, the ship is being refurbished and set to be open to visitors again on the 250th anniversary of the landing of the original Ship Hector. Next door to the Hector Heritage Quay is the Northumberland Fisheries Museum, Lobster Hatchery, and Lighthouse Museum.

In early July, the Lobster Carnival takes place. The Lobster Carnival is a yearly event celebrating the end of the fishing season and has been a town festival since 1934. The carnival includes a midway, concerts, a pageant, a car show, fireworks, and lobster dinners.

The waterfront redevelopment also features a marina and small boardwalk that connects to the Trans-Canada Trail. The historic Intercolonial Railway station on the waterfront has been restored.

Grohmann Knives Ltd, the only knife manufacturing factory in Canada, are the sole producers of the historic D.H. Russell Belt Knives and Grohmann Kitchen Knives for over 50 years. Free factory tours of the plant are offered to the public.

The McCulloch House Museum on the edge of downtown offers a research centre and a nineteenth-century house museum. The house, once belonging to Rev. Dr. Thomas McCulloch, is part of the Nova Scotia Museum network and their museum pass program.

The war cenotaph was sculpted by the renowned George Hill.

Water taxis and boat tours of the harbour are available, which also connect to the town of New Glasgow.

Pictou Town is 5 kilometres south of the port of Caribou where Northumberland Ferries Limited operates a seasonal vehicle-pedestrian ferry service to Prince Edward Island; there is also a pedestrian-only ferry that operates seasonally to Pictou Island. Several beaches are located near Pictou Town, most notably Caribou Provincial Park and Waterside Beach Provincial Park.

Notable people 

 Peter Crerar, civil engineer, came to Pictou Town from Scotland in 1817. Designed and built the Albion Mines Railway, the first standard gauge railroad in North America.
 Sir John William Dawson, born in Pictou Town in 1820. He resided in Pictou Town until 1840, when he travelled to Scotland to complete his education in geology and natural history at the University of Edinburgh. He returned to Nova Scotia in 1842 and served as superintendent of education from 1850 to 1853. In 1855, he moved to Montreal, Quebec, to become the principal of McGill University, a position he held with distinction until 1893.
 Henry Hatton, merchant, shipbuilder, and political figure
 William Lowden, the first shipbuilder in Pictou Town
 Carmen MacDonald, an ice hockey goaltender for the St. Lawrence Saints, a university team from New York State. She won a gold medal as part of Canada's National Women's Under-18 Team at the 2010 IIHF World Women’s Under-18 Championship in Chicago. 
 Christie MacDonald, American stage actress & singer (1875–1962)
 Joey MacDonald, a former NHL goaltender 
 James Drummond MacGregor, first published abolitionist in Canada
 Arthur Stanley Mackenzie, president of Dalhousie University

Vessels
Three naval vessels have been named for Pictou, two Royal Navy schooners during the War of 1812, and HMCS Pictou, a Flower-class corvette that served in the Atlantic during World War II.

See also
 List of municipalities in Nova Scotia
 Sutherland Harris Memorial Hospital

References

External links
 

 Official website of the Town of Pictou

Communities in Pictou County
Towns in Nova Scotia
Populated coastal places in Canada
Populated places established in 1773
1773 establishments in the British Empire